In Australian Aboriginal mythology, Yalungur is a great bird, an eagle or hawk. He was castrated either by Gidja or by Gidja's brother Mali so that Gidja could create the first woman.

Australian Aboriginal legendary creatures
Mythological birds of prey